Branko Ojdanić (Serbian Cyrillic: Бранко Ојданић; born 21 June 1990) is a Bosnian professional footballer who plays as a centre-back for Bosnian Premier League club Olimpik.

Honours
Borac Banja Luka
First League of RS: 2016–17

References

External links

1990 births
Living people
Sportspeople from Banja Luka
Bosnia and Herzegovina footballers
FK Laktaši players
NK Iskra Bugojno players
FK Slavija Sarajevo players
FK Kozara Gradiška players
Pécsi MFC players
NK Istra 1961 players
NK Brežice 1919 players
FK Borac Banja Luka players
OFK Titograd players
SW Bregenz players
FK Olimpik players
Premier League of Bosnia and Herzegovina players
First League of the Republika Srpska players
Nemzeti Bajnokság I players
Croatian Football League players
Slovenian Second League players
Montenegrin First League players
Austrian Regionalliga players
Association football central defenders
Bosnia and Herzegovina expatriate sportspeople in Croatia
Bosnia and Herzegovina expatriate sportspeople in Hungary
Bosnia and Herzegovina expatriate sportspeople in Slovenia
Bosnia and Herzegovina expatriate sportspeople in Montenegro
Bosnia and Herzegovina expatriate sportspeople in Austria
Expatriate footballers in Croatia
Expatriate footballers in Hungary
Expatriate footballers in Slovenia
Expatriate footballers in Montenegro
Expatriate footballers in Austria